Harry Barton may refer to:

Harry Barton (baseball) (1875–1955), American baseball player
Harry Barton (architect) (1876–1937), American architect
Harry Barton (footballer) (1874–1954), English footballer
Harry Barton (priest) (1898–1968), Archdeacon of Sudbury

See also
Harold Barton (disambiguation)
Henry Barton (disambiguation)